Blindenmarkt is a town in the district of Melk in the Austrian state of Lower Austria.

Geography
Blindenmarkt lies in the valley of the Ybbs River 8 km east of Amstetten in the Mostviertel in Lower Austria.

References

Cities and towns in Melk District